Charghat is an Upazila of Rajshahi District in the Division of Rajshahi, Bangladesh.

Background
Charghat is located on the bank of the river Padma. Bangladesh Police Academy is situated at Sardah area of the upazila. There is also a cadet college here. Charghat was declared Pourashava in 1998. Md. Anwar Hossain was the first chairman. Charghat is famous for Khoer industry. Mangoes are produced here in plenty. The noted villages of Charghat are Gopalpur, Charghat, Miapur, Babupara, Kakramari, Pirojpur, Sardah and Mokterpur. A sand mine is located here. There is a club named Mokterpur Shobuj Shangha. A charity organization named Botbrikkho is also there which works for the poor people. It was established by Md. Oashimul Bari Oashim, a student of Dhaka University's English Departnent.

Charghat is a centre of a varieties of cultural programs. Padma Boral Theatre, Projonmo Theatre of Dakra and Botbrikkho are at the helm of arranging the programs. Sports are organized here frequently.

Geography
It has 30,799 households and total area 164.52 km2.

Charghat Upazila is bounded by Puthia and Paba Upazilas on the north, Bagatipara Upazila in Natore District and Bagha Upazila on the east, Bagha Upazila in the south and Raninagar II and Jalangi CD Blocks, in Murshidabad district, West Bengal, India, across the Ganges/ Padma, on the west.

Demographics
According to 2011 Bangladesh census, Charghat had a population of 206,788. Males constituted 50.36% of the population and females 49.64%. Muslims formed 95.82% of the population, Hindus 4.04%, Christians 0.04% and others 0.11%. Charghat had a literacy rate of 47.68% for the population 7 years and above.

As of the 1991 Bangladesh census, Charghat has a population of 163862. Males constitute 51.62% of the population, and females 48.38%. This Upazila's eighteen up population is 82,597. Charghat has an average literacy rate of 26.6% (7+ years), and the national average of 32.4% literate.

Administration
Charghat Upazila is divided into Charghat Municipality, and six union parishads: Bhaya Lakshmipur, Charghat, Nimpara, Salua, Sardah, and Yusufpur. The union parishads are subdivided into 93 mauzas and 115 villages.

Education

According to Banglapedia, Sardah Government Pilot High School, founded in 1916, is a notable secondary school.

See also
Upazilas of Bangladesh
Districts of Bangladesh
Divisions of Bangladesh

References

Upazilas of Rajshahi District